Forget-me-not Lakes is a high elevation ecosystem located in Grand Teton National Park, in the U. S. state of Wyoming. Death Creek has 24 tributary streams, several of which originate from Death Shelf springs; two tributaries originate from Forget-Me-Not Lakes, elevation  and Rimrock Lake  and are located in a remote area near the head of Death Canyon on the slopes of Prospectors Mountain.

Backpacker magazine has referred to the Forget-me-not Lakes as a romantic place known for the abundance of wildflowers in the Spring and listed them as one of the recommended backcountry lakes worth a visit in Grand Teton National Park.

References

Lakes of Grand Teton National Park